Joshua Mark Lillis (born 24 June 1987) is an English professional footballer who plays as a goalkeeper for Barrow.

He began his career at Scunthorpe United in the League One and Championship. He spent time on loan at Notts County, and Grimsby Town, before making a permanent move to former loan club Rochdale in 2012. In March 2020, he joined National League side AFC Fylde on loan, before moving permanently to League Two Barrow at the end of that season.

Club career

Scunthorpe United
Born in Derby, Derbyshire, Lillis worked his way through Scunthorpe United's youth system, and made his début as a professional at Millwall on 22 December 2006. He spent most of his time at the Iron as the understudy of Joe Murphy, but has improved under the coaching of former Sheffield Wednesday stalwart Kevin Pressman.

In January 2009, Lillis went to Notts County on a one-month loan in order to experience more first team action. He made his début in 2–2 draw with Aldershot Town on 20 January 2009. His first clean sheet for the Magpies came on 14 February where Notts County beat Barnet 2–0. He returned to Scunthorpe making 5 appearances and 1 clean sheet.

On 1 September 2009, he signed for Grimsby Town on loan as cover for injured Nick Colgan. He made his début on 5 September 2009 against Port Vale, in a 4–0 defeat. He made four appearances before returning to the Iron. On 30 October he joined Rochdale on an emergency seven-day loan. His début was in a 4–0 win over AFC Bournemouth on 31 October 2009.

In July 2010, he was loaned to Rochdale again for six months.

Lillis returned to Scunthorpe at the end of his loan spell, but found his chances limited at Glanford Park and was released in May 2012.

Rochdale
On 12 June 2012, Rochdale announced that he had signed a two-year deal to return to Spotland where he had previously had a successful loan spell. After impressive displays in Rochdale's 2013/14 promotion campaign, Lillis has since committed himself to Rochdale for a further two years.

On 26 May 2016, Lillis signed a new two-year deal with Rochdale.

Lillis joined AFC Fylde on loan until the end of the season on 6 March 2020.

Barrow
Following his release from Rochdale at the end of the 2019/20 season, Lillis joined newly-promoted Barrow as a player-coach in September 2020.

Personal life
He is the son of former Scunthorpe United player and assistant manager Mark Lillis.

Career statistics

Honours
Individual
Rochdale Player of the Year: 2015–16

References

External links

1987 births
Living people
Footballers from Derby
English footballers
Association football goalkeepers
Scunthorpe United F.C. players
Notts County F.C. players
Grimsby Town F.C. players
Rochdale A.F.C. players
AFC Fylde players
Barrow A.F.C. players
Barrow A.F.C. non-playing staff
English Football League players
National League (English football) players